Miomantis rubra is a species of praying mantis in the family Miomantidae. The species was named for rubratoxin, which it carries in its antennae.

See also
List of mantis genera and species

References

R